Powell River-Sunshine Coast is a provincial electoral district for the Legislative Assembly of British Columbia, Canada.

Demographics

Member of Legislative Assembly

Election results 

|-

|}

|-

|NDP
|Nicholas Simons
|align="right"|11,099
|align="right"|43.45
|align="right"|
|align="right"|$108,403
|-

|}

|-

|-

|NDP
|Gordon Wilson
|align="right"|6,349
|align="right"|27.15%
|align="right"|
|align="right"|$50,409

|}

|-

|NDP
|Bill Forst
|align="right"|6,088
|align="right"|27.57%
|align="right"|
|align="right"|$30,942

|-

|Common Sense
|Roslyn Griston
|align="right"|57
|align="right"|0.26%
|align="right"|
|align="right"|$272

|}

|-

|NDP
|Howard White
|align="right"|7,117
|align="right"|33.88%
|align="right"|
|align="right"|$56,523

|-

|Independent
|Lynwood A. Jacob
|align="right"|66
|align="right"|0.31%
|align="right"|
|align="right"|$200

|}

References

Sources:

1. Elections BC

2. SUMMARIES OF PROVINCIAL ELECTIONS AND BY-ELECTIONS, BRITISH COLUMBIA 1928 TO 1969.By: BRITISH COLUMBIA. CHIEF ELECTORAL OFFICER, Published: 1969,  McMaster University Government Publications.

External links 
BC Stats Profile - 2001
Results of 2001 election (pdf)
2001 Expenditures
Results of 1996 election
1996 Expenditures
Results of 1991 election
1991 Expenditures
Website of the Legislative Assembly of British Columbia

British Columbia provincial electoral districts
Powell River, British Columbia